Appleton-with-Eaton is a civil parish in the Vale of White Horse district of Oxfordshire, England, south west of Oxford. Historically it was part of Berkshire until the 1974 boundary changes transferred it to Oxfordshire. It consists of Appleton and Eaton, on the south bank (here the east bank) of the River Thames.  Its area is 8.38 km².  According to the 2011 census the parish had a 915 residents, an increase of 18 over ten years.

References

External links
Parish council website

Civil parishes in Oxfordshire